Nicol Lucák Čupková (born 4 November 1992) is a Slovak ice hockey forward and member of the Slovak national ice hockey team. She most recently played with Agidel Ufa during the 2021–22 season of the Zhenskaya Hockey League (ZhHL) until leaving the team in early March, shortly after the Russian invasion of Ukraine began.

International career
Lucák Čupková represented Slovakia in the women's ice hockey tournament at the 2010 Winter Olympics in Vancouver. She played in all five games and tied for the team lead in scoring with three points. She also played in all three games of the 2010 Olympic qualification tournament.

Lucák Čupková has also appeared for Slovakia at five IIHF Women's World Championships across two divisions. Her first appearance came in 2009. She appeared at the Top Division championships in 2011 and 2012.

She competed in two IIHF World Women's U18 Championships for the Slovak national U18 team, winning Division I bronze medals in the 2009 and 2010, earning recognition as the top scorer of the 2009 tournament.

Career statistics

International

References

External links
 
 
 

1992 births
Living people
Slovak women's ice hockey forwards
Ice hockey players at the 2010 Winter Olympics
Olympic ice hockey players of Slovakia
Sportspeople from Košice
HC Agidel Ufa players
Slovak expatriate ice hockey players in Russia